The 2016 Big 12 Conference women's soccer season was the 21st season of women's varsity soccer in the conference.

The West Virginia Mountaineers are the defending regular season champions, and the Texas Tech Red Raiders are the defending tournament champions.

Changes from 2015 

 Kansas State added a women's soccer program for the start of the 2016 season. The team will eventually join the conference at a time to be determined.

Teams

Stadia and locations

Regular season

Rankings

Postseason

Big 12 tournament

Bracket

NCAA tournament

All-Big 12 awards and teams

See also 
 2016 NCAA Division I women's soccer season
 2016 Big 12 Conference Women's Soccer Tournament

References 

 
2016 NCAA Division I women's soccer season